National Highway 309A, commonly referred to as NH 309A, is a single lane highway connecting the city of Rameshwar to Almora in the Indian State of Uttarakhand. Before the creation of Uttarakhand state in 2000, the Almora-Bageshwar stretch of this Highway was a part of the State Highway 37 of Uttar Pradesh, which ran from Bageshwar to Bareilly.

History
The Almora-Bageshwar stretch of this Highway was a part of the provincial 'Almora-Joshimath cart road' during the nineteenth century. The road had a steep descent on the way to Thakla (now Takula), and was surrounded by dense forests of Oak and Rhododendrons. However, the hills were covered by very fine Cheer forests between Thakla and Bageshwar. Later in 1909; several sections of the highway were recorded in the Almora Gazetter as "III class local roads", including the 24 mile 'Gangolihat to Dharamghar road' and the 22 mile 'Bageshwar to Berinag road'.

Route
It starts at Rameshwar and ends at Almora. The NH309A lies entirely in Uttarakhand and passes through the Districts of Pithoragarh, Bageshwar and Almora.

The National Highway 309A connects cities and towns of different districts as follows: Rameshwar, Gangolihat, Berinag, Chaukori, Kanda, Bageshwar, Takula, Almora.

Junctions  

  Terminal near Rameshwar.
  at Bageshwar.
  Terminal near Almora.

National Highway 309B
An Alternate highway, known as National Highway 309B or NH309B also connects the cities of Almora and Rameshwar. It cuts down the travel distance to 66 km by covering a direct route rather than taking the long route of 126 km via Bageshwar.

Gallery

References

External links 
NH 309A on OpenStreetMap

National Highways in Uttarakhand
National highways in India